InfoCision Stadium–Summa Field is a college American football stadium in Akron, Ohio and the home field of the Akron Zips football team at the University of Akron. New for the 2009 football season, the official ground-breaking ceremony for the stadium was held on April 4, 2008, and it opened on September 12, 2009, for a sold-out game between the Akron Zips and the Morgan State Bears. The stadium was constructed to replace the Rubber Bowl, which was the prior home of the University of Akron Zips football team. Four companies hold naming rights to various parts of the stadium.

History

InfoCision Stadium was constructed as part of a building initiative undergone by the University of Akron called the "New Landscape for Learning." The $300 million construction program included the construction and renovations of numerous buildings on campus, including the Buchtel College of Arts and Sciences building, an honors complex, a student recreation center, and a student union. Due to the high maintenance costs for the facility, the decision was made to construct an on-campus stadium.

To build the new stadium, several dormitories had to be demolished and the properties of local tenants were acquired using eminent domain. In order to house the displaced students, the University spent $22.6 million to purchase Quaker Square, a former Quaker Oats Company oat silo that was converted into a hotel.

The home opener of the 2009 football season marked the first game held in InfoCision Stadium.  In it, the Zips defeated Morgan State 41–0. To mark the occasion, a ribbon-cutting ceremony was held to inaugurate the new stadium.  Amongst those who cut the ribbon were Don Plusquellic (Mayor of Akron), Betty Sutton (member of the United States House of Representatives), and Luis Proenza (President of the University of Akron).
In the 2014-2015 season, the cumulative total attendance for six games in the 30,000 seat facility was 55,019, the worst among all 125 teams in the NCAA Football Bowl subdivision.

Structure and facilities
InfoCision Stadium holds 27,000 spectators in traditional seating with an additional 3,000 the grassy knoll on the south end of the stadium. The cost for the stadium complex, including the end zone facility, was $61.6 million. There is one team shop, located on the south side of the stadium. A  video board is surrounded by the frame. In addition, there are video ribbon boards located throughout. Premium seating options include the Huntington Club Level, which features 522 Club Seats, 38 luxury boxes, two bar areas, and upscale concessions; 17 Suites, which include 16 private suites, and one presidential suite; and the Towpath Credit Union Press Level. The 7th level of the western building contains press rooms. Lower levels of the tower include locker rooms and sports medicine facilities.

The stadium also has a sloped, grassy hill at the south end of the field that seats 3,000 people. The section is used to accommodate spillover from the 5,000 seat student section, also known as the "Roo Zoo", that is located in the bleachers adjacent to the hill on both sides of the field.

Naming rights
The stadium is named for InfoCision Management Corporation and the playing field for Summa Health System. In the press tower on the stadium's west side, the club seating is named after the Columbus-based Huntington Bancshares and the press box for the local Towpath Credit Union. Principal naming rights for the stadium were purchased through a personal donation by Gary Taylor, Founder and Chairman of InfoCision Management Corporation, a firm based in nearby Bath Township that operates call centers.  Through Taylor's $10 million donation to the university, InfoCision secured naming rights for the stadium for 20 years.

Summa Health System, an Ohio Non-Profit Hospital, purchased (by means of its for-profit insurance company, SummaCare) 20 years of naming rights for the field with a $5 million donation. FirstMerit Corporation, a financial services company headquartered in Akron, purchased naming rights for the club level seating of the press tower for 10 years. Naming rights were transferred to Columbus-based Huntington after the buyout of FirstMerit. Towpath Credit Union pledged $100,000 over five years to secure naming rights to the press box located in top level of the press tower until 2013, with an additional option for a 5-year extension through 2018.

Attendance records

See also
List of NCAA Division I FBS football stadiums

References

External links

College football venues
Akron Zips football
Tourist attractions in Akron, Ohio
American football venues in Ohio
2009 establishments in Ohio
Sports venues completed in 2009
Sports venues in Akron, Ohio